Jennifer "Jen" Armbruster  (born February 12, 1975 in Taipei) is an American goalball player. She was married to Jackie Bower and has a son and three other children.  Her wife is fellow goalballer Asya Miller.

Armbruster began losing her vision at 14, but continued to play in her school's basketball team when the sight progressed to the point of being legally blind. She later lost her vision completely and therefore did not join the military like her father. Instead she found success in goalball and played at the 1992 Summer Paralympics and several Paralympic Games since. She has won a gold medal.

See also 
 United States women's national goalball team
 2012 Summer Paralympics roster
 2016 Summer Paralympics roster

References

External links 
 
 

1975 births
Living people
Female goalball players
Paralympic goalball players of the United States
Paralympic gold medalists for the United States
Paralympic silver medalists for the United States
Paralympic bronze medalists for the United States
Paralympic medalists in goalball
Goalball players at the 1992 Summer Paralympics
Goalball players at the 2004 Summer Paralympics
Goalball players at the 2008 Summer Paralympics
Goalball players at the 2012 Summer Paralympics
Goalball players at the 2016 Summer Paralympics
Medalists at the 1996 Summer Paralympics
Medalists at the 2004 Summer Paralympics
Medalists at the 2008 Summer Paralympics
Medalists at the 2016 Summer Paralympics
Medalists at the 2011 Parapan American Games
Medalists at the 2015 Parapan American Games
Sportspeople from Taipei
21st-century American women